The Global 16 Days Campaign is an international campaign to challenge violence against women and girls. The campaign runs every year from 25 November, the International Day for the Elimination of Violence against Women, to 10 December, Human Rights Day. 

Originally called the "16 Days of Activism Against Gender-Based Violence" campaign, it was initiated in 1991 by the first Women's Global Leadership Institute, held by the Center for Women's Global Leadership (CWGL), at Rutgers University.

Since 1991, more than 6,000 organizations from approximately 187 countries have participated in the campaign.

Significant dates 
 November 25 – International Day for the Elimination of Violence Against Women
 November 29 – International Women Human Rights Defenders Day
 December 1 – World AIDS Day
 December 3 – International Day of Persons with Disabilities
 December 5 – Volunteer Day for Economic and Social Development
 December 6 – Anniversary of the Montreal Massacre, which is observed as the National Day of Remembrance and Action on Violence Against Women in Canada
 December 10 – International Human Rights Day and the anniversary of the Universal Declaration of Human Rights

Themes 

Every year, the 16 Days of Activism Against Gender-Based Violence Campaign either introduces a new theme, or continues an old theme. The theme focuses on one particular area of gender inequality and works to bring attention to these issues and make changes that will have an impact. The Center for Women's Global Leadership sends out a "Take Action Kit" every year, detailing how participants can get involved and campaign in order to make a change.
 The first campaign theme in 1991 was entitled Violence Against Women Violates Human Rights, and women from around the world came together with the Center for Women's Global Leadership at the first International Women's Leadership Institute. The theme was used again in 1992.
 In 1993, the third campaign's second theme was Democracy in the Family, Democracy of Families, Democracy for Every Body.
 The 1994 theme brought back the first theme, but with a minor change. It was entitled Awareness, Accountability, Action: Violence Against Women Violates Human Rights.
 The 1995 theme, Vienna, Cairo, Copenhagen, and Beijing: Bringing Women's Human Rights Home, focused on four major conferences, including the Fourth World Conference on Women in Beijing (September 1995), which was "the third major UN conference since the World Conference on Human Rights in Vienna (1993)," and "...follows the International Conference on Population and Development (Cairo, 1994), and the World Summit on Social Development (Copenhagen, 1995)."
 As a follow up to the 1995 themes and major conferences within recent years, the 1996 theme was Bringing Women's Human Rights Home: Realizing Our Visions.
 The 1997 Campaign was Demand Human Rights in the Home and the World, which was working towards the 1998 Global Campaign for Women's Human Rights.
 The theme for the campaign in 1998 was Building a Culture of Respect for Human Rights.
 The 1999 campaign theme was entitled Fulfilling the Promise of Freedom from Violence.
 In 2000, the theme was Celebrating the 10th Anniversary of the Campaign, in which participants would review the accomplishments of the last 10 years of the campaign and build upon those achievements. The center also asked participants to send in documentation of their work in order to initiate a project to document the efforts of the campaign.
 The campaign theme in 2001 was Racism and Sexism: No More Violence.
 The campaign theme in 2002 was Creating a Culture that Says No to Violence Against Women.
 The 2003 campaign, Violence Against Women Violates Human Rights: Maintaining the Momentum Ten Years After Vienna (1993–2003), was focused on reviewing changes that had occurred in the 10 years since the Vienna Declaration that was a result of the World Conference on Human Rights in Vienna (1993) and the UN General Assembly's adoption of the Declaration on the Elimination of Violence Against Women (2003).
 The 2004–2005 campaign was entitled For the Health of Women, for the Health of the World: No More Violence, particularly focused on the "intersection of violence against women and the HIV/AIDS pandemic."

 The 2006 campaign, Celebrate 16 Years of 16 Days: Advance Human Rights <--> End Violence Against Women,  celebrated not only those who had contributed to the campaign, but those who had given their lives or suffered violence during their fight against gender inequality.
 The 2007 campaign was entitled Demanding Implementation, Challenging Obstacles: End Violence Against Women.
 The 2008 campaign title was Human Rights for Women <--> Human Rights for All: UDHR60, which celebrated the 60th anniversary of the Universal Declaration of Human Rights.
 The 2009 theme was Commit, Act, Demand: We CAN End Violence Against Women!
 The theme in 2010 marked the 20th year of the 16 Days of Activism Against Gender Violence Campaign, and was entitled Structures of Violence: Defining the Intersections of Militarism and Violence Against Women.
 From 2011 to 2014, the theme of the campaign was From Peace in the Home to Peace in the World: Let's Challenge Militarism and End Violence Against Women!
 In 2015 and 2016, the theme of the campaign was From Peace in the Home to Peace in the World: Make Education Safe for All!
In 2019 the multi-year theme of Ending Gender-Based Violence in the World of Work was launched to support ratification of ILO C190.
2020 continued the ILO C190 multi-year theme of Ending GBV in the World of Work with a special focus on informal women workers who were most affected by the COVID-19 pandemic.
2021 marked the 30th anniversary of the Campaign. The ILO C190 theme focused on Domestic Violence and the World of Work. A special anniversary theme of Ending Femicide was also launched.
In 2022, the Ending Femicide theme was continued, with a special focus on groups of women who are more vulnerable to femicide.

References

External links 
 ; Official website.
 ; United Nations Women.
 ; United Nations Population Fund.
 ; Office of the High Commissioner for Human Rights, the United Nations.

Human rights
November observances
December observances
Gender-related violence
Violence against women